Marco Gozzano (born 26 September 1963) is a former Italian male long-distance runner who competed at five editions of the IAAF World Cross Country Championships at senior level (from 1984 to 1988).

References

External links
 

1963 births
Living people
Italian male long-distance runners
Italian male marathon runners
Italian male cross country runners